Stefano Ruffini (Rome, 14 June 1963 – Naples, 7 December 2006) was an Italian singer and voice actor. He performed songs of Grazia Di Michele "Canto bolero" (1988) and "Si chiama Helene" (1989) at the Sanremo Music Festival.

References

1963 births
2006 deaths
20th-century Italian  male singers
Singers from Rome